A switched capacitor (SC) is an electronic circuit that implements a function by moving charges into and out of capacitors when electronic switches are opened and closed. Usually, non-overlapping clock signals are used to control the switches, so that not all switches are closed simultaneously. Filters implemented with these elements are termed switched-capacitor filters, which depend only on the ratios between capacitances and the switching frequency, and not on precise resistors. This makes them much more suitable for use within integrated circuits, where accurately specified resistors and capacitors are not economical to construct.

SC circuits are typically implemented using metal–oxide–semiconductor (MOS) technology, with MOS capacitors and MOS field-effect transistor (MOSFET) switches, and they are commonly fabricated using the complementary MOS (CMOS) process. Common applications of MOS SC circuits include mixed-signal integrated circuits, digital-to-analog converter (DAC) chips, analog-to-digital converter (ADC) chips, pulse-code modulation (PCM) codec-filters, and PCM digital telephony.

Parallel resistor simulation using a switched-capacitor 

Recall that Ohm's law can express the relationship between voltage, current, and resistance as:

The following equivalent resistance calculation will show how during each switching cycle, this switched-capacitor circuit transfers an amount of charge from in to out such that it behaves according to a similar linear current–voltage relationship with

Equivalent resistance calculation 
By definition, the charge  on any capacitor  with a voltage  between its plates is:

Therefore, when S is closed while S is open, the charge stored in the capacitor  will be:

assuming  is an ideal voltage source.

When S is closed (S is open - they are never both closed at the same time), some of that charge is transferred out of the capacitor. Exactly how much charge gets transferred can't be determined without knowing what load is attached to the output. However, by definition, the charge remaining on capacitor  can be expressed in terms of the unknown variable :

Thus, the charge transferred from in to out during one switching cycle is:

So the average electric current (rate of transfer of charge per unit time) from in to out is:

The voltage difference from in to out can be written as:

Finally, the current–voltage relationship from in to out can be expressed with the same form as Ohm's law, to show that this switched-capacitor circuit simulates a resistor with an equivalent resistance of:

This circuit is called a parallel resistor simulation because in and out are connected in parallel and not directly coupled. Other types of SC simulated resistor circuits are bilinear resistor simulation, series resistor simulation, series-parallel resistor simulation, and parasitic-insensitive resistor simulation.

Difference with real resistor 
Charge is transferred from in to out as discrete pulses, not continuously. This transfer approximates the equivalent continuous transfer of charge of a resistor when the switching frequency is sufficiently higher (≥100x) than the bandlimit of the input signal.

The SC circuit modeled here using ideal switches with zero resistance does not suffer from the ohmic heating energy loss of a regular resistor, and so ideally could be called a loss free resistor. However real switches have some small resistance in their channel or p–n junctions, so power is still dissipated.

Because the resistance inside electric switches is typically much smaller than the resistances in circuits relying on regular resistors, SC circuits can have substantially lower Johnson–Nyquist noise. However harmonics of the switching frequency may be manifested as high frequency noise that may need to be attenuated with a low-pass filter.

SC simulated resistors also have the benefit that their equivalent resistance can be adjusted by changing the switching frequency (i.e., it is a programmable resistance) with a resolution limited by the resolution of the switching period. Thus online or runtime adjustment can be done by controlling the oscillation of the switches (e.g. using an configurable clock output signal from a microcontroller).

Applications 

SC simulated resistors are used as a replacement for real resistors in integrated circuits because it is easier to fabricate reliably with a wide range of values and can take up much less silicon area.

This same circuit can be used in discrete time systems (such as ADCs) as a sample and hold circuit. During the appropriate clock phase, the capacitor samples the analog voltage through switch S1 and in the second phase presents this held sampled value through switch S2 to an electronic circuit for processing.

Filters 
Electronic filters consisting of resistors and capacitors can have their resistors replaced with equivalent switched-capacitor simulated resistors, allowing the filter to be manufactured using only switches and capacitors without relying on real resistors.

The parasitic-sensitive integrator

Switched-capacitor simulated resistors can replace the input resistor in an op amp integrator to provide accurate voltage gain and integration.

One of the earliest of these circuits is the parasitic-sensitive integrator developed by the Czech engineer Bedrich Hosticka.

Analysis 
Denote by  the switching period. In capacitors,

Then, when S1 opens and S2 closes (they are never both closed at the same time), we have the following:

1) Because  has just charged:

2) Because the feedback cap, is suddenly charged with that much charge (by the op amp, which seeks a virtual short circuit between its inputs):

Now dividing 2) by :

And inserting 1):

However, there is a more elegant way to formulate this fact if  is very short.

Therefore, the op-amp output voltage takes the form:

This is the same formula as the op amp inverting integrator where the resistance is replaced by a SC simulated resistor with an equivalent resistance of:

This switched-capacitor circuit is called "parasitic-sensitive" because its behavior is significantly affected by parasitic capacitances, which will cause errors when parasitic capacitances can't be controlled. "Parasitic insensitive" circuits try to overcome this.

The parasitic insensitive integrator

Use in discrete-time systems
The delaying parasitic insensitive integrator has a wide use in discrete time electronic circuits such as biquad filters, anti-alias structures, and delta-sigma data converters. This circuit implements the following z-domain function:

The multiplying digital to analog converter

One useful characteristic of switched-capacitor circuits is that they can be used to perform many circuit tasks at the same time, which is difficult with non-discrete time components (i.e. analog electronics). The multiplying digital to analog converter (MDAC) is an example as it can take an analog input, add a digital value  to it, and multiply this by some factor based on the capacitor ratios. The output of the MDAC is given by the following:

The MDAC is a common component in modern pipeline analog to digital converters as well as other precision analog electronics and was first created in the form above by Stephen Lewis and others at Bell Laboratories.

Analysis of switched-capacitor circuits
Switched-capacitor circuits are analysed by writing down charge conservation equations, as in this article, and solving them with a computer algebra tool. For hand analysis and for getting more insight into the circuits, it is also possible to do a Signal-flow graph analysis, with a method that is very similar for switched-capacitor and continuous-time circuits.

See also
 Aliasing
 Charge pump
 Nyquist–Shannon sampling theorem
 Switched-mode power supply
 Thyristor-switched capacitor (TSC)

References

Mingliang Liu, Demystifying Switched-Capacitor Circuits, 

Capacitors
Electronic filter applications
Electronic filter topology
MOSFETs
Voltage regulation